Fyke Farmer (November 25, 1901 – May 23, 1997), was a Tennessee lawyer who worked on the behalf of Julius and Ethel Rosenberg.

Biography
He was born on November 25, 1901 in Cedar Hill, Tennessee. He married Fanny Richards Leake, daughter of Charles Richards Leake. They had three daughters, Dorothy Leake Farmer, Mary Sue Farmer, and Anne Farmer and a son Fyke Farmer.

Farmer argued that the Rosenbergs were tried under the wrong law, claiming that the Atomic Energy Act, under which a sentence of death can be imposed only upon recommendation of a jury, should have been applied rather than the Espionage Act of 1917, which leaves that power exclusively to the discretion of the court. On the basis of Farmer's arguments, a temporary stay was granted to the Rosenbergs by Justice William O. Douglas on 17 June 1953. The United States Supreme Court vacated Douglas's stay by a vote of 6-3. The Rosenbergs were executed on 19 June 1953. In 1990, Farmer filed "United States ex rel. Farmer v. Kaufman" against Irving R. Kaufman, the judge who presided over the Rosenbergs' trial, but he was found to have no standing to sue Kaufman. His papers are archived at the Library of Congress.

References

1901 births
1997 deaths
People from Robertson County, Tennessee
Tennessee lawyers
American tax resisters
20th-century American lawyers